The Government College of Engineering & Textile Technology, Serampore (GCETTS) is an engineering college in Serampore, West Bengal, India.

History
A textile industry was established in India in the middle of 19th century. The need for trained technical personnel to drive that was felt in Bengal which led to the establishment of the institution. The Government College of Engineering and Textile Technology Serampore was established in 1908 as the Government Central Weaving Institute with a two-year certificate course in weaving in a rented house in Serampore. 
In 1938, a three-year diploma course in textile technology was started which was upgraded to degree course in 1957 under the affiliation of Calcutta University.

The institution was renamed as College of Textile Technology Serampore, which was changed to its present name in 2005.
From the year 2009 B.Tech in A.P.M and M.Tech in Chemical Processing of Textile was started.

Present status

Undergraduate and post graduate courses are:
 BTech in Textile Technology
 BTech in Computer Science and Engineering
 BTech in Information Technology
 BTech in Apparel Production and Management
 M.Tech in Textile Technology
 M.Tech in Chemical Processing Of Textiles

Department of Textile Technology 
This is the oldest department of the college. Earlier affiliated with University of Calcutta, the college has contributed immensely in providing technical manpower to the textile industry of the country. The department offers Post Graduate Programme ( M.Tech) as well. The department has state of the art machines in its spinning, weaving, Textile Processing lab and Testing lab.

Computer science and information technology departments

The Computer Science and Engineering Department and Information Technology Department were formed in 2001 and 2000 respectively. Due to the formation of West Bengal University of Technology, the Serampore Textile College incorporated in its curriculum the CSE and IT departments and changed its name to the present name. The CSE and IT departments share all the labs as the subjects are very similar.

Laboratories include electronics, microprocessors, communication engineering, software labs (operating systems, database management systems (DBMS), media, control and systems simulation), basic programming (subjects like Java, World Wide Web, Artificial Intelligence). The physics lab, chemistry lab, and mechanical workshop and electrical workshop, are shared among all departments.

Gallery

References

External links
 Official website
 Official website of WBUT

Colleges affiliated to West Bengal University of Technology
Engineering colleges in West Bengal
Textile schools in India
Universities and colleges in Hooghly district
1908 establishments in India
Educational institutions established in 1908